Josh Saunders (born March 2, 1981) is an American former professional footballer who played as a goalkeeper. He last played for Orlando City in Major League Soccer.

Career

College
Saunders, the younger brother of Shawn Saunders, spent the final two seasons of his collegiate career at Berkeley, after spending the previous two at California State University, Fullerton. He was named a First Team All-Pac-10 selection in each of his two seasons with the Golden Bears, and during his senior season he became the first keeper ever to be named Pac-10 Player of the Year. He has a B.A. in American studies.

Professional

After being selected in the fourth round of the 2003 MLS SuperDraft Saunders made the roster of the San Jose Earthquakes, but did not appear in an official match. Instead, Saunders played on loan with the Portland Timbers in the USL First Division, where he played every minute of his 16 games, allowing only 15 goals, giving him a 0.90 GAA for the 2003 season. The next year, he started 24 games and posted a 1.11 GAA with six shutouts. Chief among his feats was a 363-minute scoreless streak, which, until recently, was the longest in Timbers history.

Saunders joined Los Angeles Galaxy in 2005 as third-choice keeper behind Kevin Hartman and Steve Cronin, but again failed to appear in a first team game, logged only 15 minutes as a substitute in a game for the Galaxy's reserves. In 2007, Saunders and three other players were waived from the LA Galaxy. Some bloggers suspected this was due to the massive expense of acquiring soccer star David Beckham, and despite a successful pre-season trial with Chicago Fire, signed for the Puerto Rico Islanders for the 2007 season. He made his debut for the Islanders in a 2-1 victory over the Rochester Raging Rhinos on April 14, 2007.

On April 11, 2008, Saunders signed with Miami FC, and subsequently made 27 appearances for the Florida team, until he was loaned to Los Angeles Galaxy in September 2008 for the remainder of the MLS season. Saunders signed a permanent contract with Galaxy in early 2009, and was expected to serve as understudy to Donovan Ricketts.

On November 22, 2009, he came on in the 2nd half in relief of the injured Ricketts during the 2009 MLS Cup. Despite holding Real Salt Lake scoreless for the remaining 26 minutes of regulation and 30 minutes of extra time, Saunders was unable to guide the Galaxy to their 3rd MLS Cup title when he could stop only two of seven Salt Lake penalty attempts.

Saunders had an impressive season during 2011, putting in commanding performances in the Galaxy's goal in the absence of Ricketts, who was out for most of the season with a long-term injury. In 2012, he guided Galaxy to victory in MLS Cup 2012 helping the club win their 4th MLS Cup in history and first back-to-back championships.

On February 22, 2013, Saunders contract with Galaxy expired and it was not renewed due to the arrival of Carlo Cudicini. After requesting to join the preseason camp of Real Salt Lake, Saunders saw his first minutes with the Claret and Cobalt in a preseason win over the Galaxy. He was later signed as a backup for Nick Rimando. During Rimando's absences for the 2013 CONCACAF Gold Cup, Saunders made 2 starts, but tore his ACL on July 13 against FC Dallas and missed the rest of the season, and his option was declined following the season.

On July 10, 2014, it was confirmed that Saunders would sign for MLS expansion franchise New York City FC on a free transfer, joining the San Antonio Scorpions on loan until the end of 2014. It was also confirmed that he would join New York City's sister club Manchester City in their tour of Scotland.

Saunders was traded by NYCFC to Orlando City on January 27, 2017 in exchange for a fourth-round pick in the 2019 MLS SuperDraft. Saunders' contract option was not renewed by Orlando City following the 2017 season.

International
In 2008, Saunders made his debut with the Puerto Rican national team, and is now considered to have Puerto Rican sporting nationality. Prior to his international switch, Saunders made an appearance for the U.S. U-23 national team in 2002 against Canada.

Career statistics

Honors

Club
San Jose Earthquakes
MLS Cup (1): 2003
Major League Soccer Western Conference Championship (1): 2003

Portland Timbers (USL)
USL A-League Commissioner's Cup (1): 2004

Los Angeles Galaxy
MLS Cup (2): 2011, 2012
Major League Soccer Supporters' Shield (2): 2010, 2011
Major League Soccer Western Conference Championship (3): 2009, 2011, 2012

Real Salt Lake
Major League Soccer Western Conference Championship (1): 2013

San Antonio Scorpions
North American Soccer League Soccer Bowl (1): 2014

Individual
NYCFC Etihad Player of the month: March 2015
NYCFC Etihad Player of the month: April 2015
NYCFC Etihad Player of the month: October 2015

References

External links
 
 
 
 

1981 births
Living people
American soccer players
Puerto Rican footballers
Soccer players from Oregon
Cal State Fullerton Titans men's soccer players
California Golden Bears men's soccer players
San Jose Earthquakes players
Portland Timbers (2001–2010) players
LA Galaxy players
Puerto Rico Islanders players
Miami FC (2006) players
Real Salt Lake players
San Antonio Scorpions players
New York City FC players
Orlando City SC players
Orlando City B players
Association football goalkeepers
A-League (1995–2004) players
USL First Division players
Major League Soccer players
North American Soccer League players
USL Championship players
Sportspeople from Grants Pass, Oregon
United States men's under-23 international soccer players
Puerto Rico international footballers
San Jose Earthquakes draft picks
Major League Soccer All-Stars